Churchill Island is a  island in Western Port, Victoria, Australia. It is connected by a bridge to Phillip Island, which is in turn connected to the mainland by another bridge. It is the site of the first European garden in Victoria. It contains a working farm, cottages dating from the 1860s and a homestead dating from 1872, all fully restored and open to the public. The island adjoins the  Churchill Island Marine National Park. The island is maintained by Phillip Island Nature Parks.

History
The Boonwurrong people may have visited Churchill Island for thousands of years before Europeans arrived. 

In 1801, during the course of a survey of Western Port, Lieutenant James Grant had some of his convict crew fell some trees and build a blockhouse on Churchill Island. They cultivated a patch of soil and Grant planted seeds of wheat, corn, potatoes, peas, coffee berries, apples, peaches and nectarines given to him for the purpose of creating a garden "for the future benefit of our fellow men be they Countrymen, Europeans or Savages" by John Churchill of Dawlish in Devon, England. This was the first European garden and crop of wheat grown in Victoria.

Samuel Amess, a former mayor of Melbourne, purchased the island in 1872 and built the substantial home that still stands today.

Remains of stone foundations from two unknown buildings are also preserved on the island.

Churchill Island and the area around it served as the location for the 1977 Australian film Summerfield.

Natural environment
The Churchill Island Marine National Park adjoins the island's western shore, and Western Port bay, in which the island is located, is listed under the Ramsar Convention. Cape Barren geese can be frequently observed on the island.

References

Islands of Victoria (Australia)
Phillip Island
Western Port
Victorian Heritage Register
Bass Coast Shire